Round Island or Ngan Chau (Chinese: 銀洲) is an island in Hong Kong. Administratively part of the Southern District, the island has an area of  km2. An unmanned navigational beacon was constructed on the island in 1972.

Geology 
Round Island has a hilly terrain. The island's highest point is 49 metres over the sea. It stretches 0.6 km in north–south direction, and 0.5 km in east–west direction.

Climate 
The climate in the area is temperate. The yearly mean temperature in the region is 21 °C. The warmest month is August, when the mean temperature is 24 °C, and the coldest is February at 16 °C. The average yearly precipitation is 2150 mm. The rainiest month is May, with in average 538 mm precipitation, and the driest month is October, with 18 mm precipitation.

References 

Islands of Hong Kong
Uninhabited islands of Hong Kong